Vadina is a 1955 Indian Telugu-language drama film, produced by A. V. Meiyappan of AVM Productions and directed by M. V. Raman. It stars Akkineni Nageshwara Rao, Savitri  and music jointly composed by R. Sudarshanam and Ashwatthama. The film was a remake of the Tamil film Chella Pillai (1955).

Plot
Raghu (Akkineni Nageshwara Rao) is brought up by his brother Narasaiah (B. R. Panthulu) and his sister-in-law Shantamma (Kannamba). Shantamma covers for all mischievous deeds of Raghu, even petty crimes, without bothering to correct him. Soon, he grows into an irresponsible young man addicted to gambling. He meets a young woman Lalitha (Savitri), who dreams of becoming a movie star. He promises to introduce her to movies. Meanwhile, the family decides to get him married to a modest young woman Chitti [Pandari Bai) in the hope that he would become a better human being. Raghu leaves home along with Lalitha to make a movie. Needing money for the productions, he steals from the shop where his brother Narasaiah works, resulting in the kind man losing his job. Raghu gets involved in the printing of fakes notes and when his brother seeks help, he gives him the counterfeit currency, resulting in the arrest of Narasaiah. Rest of the story is how Raghu realizes his mistake and protects his brother.

Cast
 Akkineni Nageshwara Rao as Raghu		
 Savitri as Lalitha
 Relangi as Kalikaalam
 B. R. Panthulu as Narasaiah
 Gummadi as Director Yamudu		
 Addola Narayana Rao as Rayabaram
 Javar Seetharaman as Basavappa	
 Kannamba as Shantamma
 Pandari Bai as Chitti

Soundtrack

Music composed by R. Sudarshana, Ashwatthama. Lyrics were written by Toleti Venkata Reddy. Music released on Audio Company.

Boxoffice
 The film ran for 100 days in Vijayawada.

References

External links
 

1955 films
1950s Telugu-language films
Indian black-and-white films
Telugu remakes of Tamil films
Films directed by M. V. Raman
Films scored by R. Sudarsanam
Films scored by Ashwatthama